Timothy Andrew Keith Rodber (born 2 July 1969) is an English former rugby union footballer who played at Number eight, flanker or lock for Northampton Saints, England, and the British and Irish Lions.

Background
Rodber excelled at rugby from an early age, representing his school as well as local sides Petersfield R.F.C. and Oxford Old Boys. He attended Churcher's College and studied biology at Oxford Polytechnic (now Oxford Brookes University) on Army scholarships.

Rodber was a captain in the Green Howards infantry regiment of the British Army and remained so even after rugby turned professional. He resigned in 2001 after retiring from the sport.

Playing career
In 1987 Rodber joined the Northampton Saints academy and went on to become club captain.

Whilst at Northampton he started in the victorious 2000 Heineken Cup Final as the Saints defeated Munster.

International
He made his debut for England in the 25–7 victory over Scotland in the 1992 Five Nations Championship.

Good performances including helping England to win the 1993 Rugby World Cup Sevens title.

On the 1994 England tour to South Africa Rodber became one of the few Englishmen in the 1990s to be sent off when he was given a red card in a violent tour game against Eastern Province for reacting to a stamp on teammate Jon Callard.
However, the same tour saw Rodber play a vital role in one of England's best away performance of the decade during the 32–15 win in Pretoria. "Has one ever seen an England team glisten in a ball-game with such a shimmering and sustained diamond brightness?" commented journalist Frank Keating. "Rodber and his forwards were quite stupendous from first to last." Rodber said the aftermath of the sending off, including limiting his physicality when playing and possibly preventing his selection as England captain, stayed with him and negatively impacted his play for several years afterwards.

Rodber earned selection to the 1997 British Lions tour to South Africa. He captained the midweek side against Mpumalanga, but was seen initially as behind the other No. 8s for the Test side. However an injury to Scott Quinnell, and then Eric Miller catching flu, led to Rodber starting the First test. Rodber became one of the stand out performers during the tour. He was selected at No.8 for the first two Tests, both of which the Lions won to take the series 2–1.

Injury dogged Rodber's career. He was selected for England for the 1999 Rugby World Cup and was a replacement for the losing quarter final. Rodber retired at the end of the 2000/01 season.

Post-retirement
Rodber went into management after retiring and held executive posts including as Managing Director at London-based marketing and communications company Rodber Thorneycroft Ltd, which was acquired by Williams Lea in 2003. He then had successful stints as regional COO and CEO of Williams Lea.  He worked for Middleton Advisors until 2013.  In July 2013 he was appointed CEO of global workspace providers, Instant.

References

External links

Sporting Heroes profile

1969 births
Living people
Army rugby union players
Alumni of Oxford Brookes University
British & Irish Lions rugby union players from England
England international rugby union players
English rugby union players
Graduates of the Royal Military Academy Sandhurst
Green Howards officers
North of England Rugby Union team
Northampton Saints players
People educated at Churcher's College
England international rugby sevens players
Male rugby sevens players
British chief executives
People from Petersfield
Chief operating officers
Rugby union flankers
Rugby union number eights
Rugby union locks
Rugby union players from Yorkshire